Bahir Dar is the capital city of Amhara Region, Ethiopia. Bahir Dar is one of the leading tourist destinations in Ethiopia, with a variety of attractions in the nearby Lake Tana and Blue Nile river. The city is known for its wide avenues lined with palm trees and a variety of colorful flowers. In 2002, it was awarded the UNESCO Cities for Peace Prize for addressing the challenges of rapid urbanization.

History

Origins
Originally the settlement was called Bahir Giyorgis. Between 1810 and 1900, Bahir Dar had 1,200 to 2,000 inhabitants. It was developed in situ as   a monastery and function of trading hub. In the 19th century, Bahir Dar was visited by Belgian, French, British and Italian travelers, who described it alternatively as a village or a town.

20th century
During the early 20th century, the British, desiring to construct a barrage at the outlet of Lake Tana, dispatched several study teams, such as those of Dupis (1902), Grabham and Black (1920–21) and Cheesman (1926–34). In 1930 the Ethiopian Government sent to Bahir Dar its own team of experts, who described Bahir Dar as a village with considerable trading activity, with a population from the interior as well as from Lake Tana ports such as Zege. At this time Bahir Dar was characterized by various traditional settlement areas, each of which was distinguished by the social position its members occupied. The kahenat (clergy) and balabbat communities were the most important. In addition, three groups of tenant-craftsman communities, tanners, Muslims weavers and the Weyto stone-mill grinders, lived on balabbat lands. Although all were economically interdependent, there was no intermarriage between the tenant communities or between them and the balabbat and kahenat.

In May 1936, Bahir Dar was occupied by the Italians, who gave it modern urban features. Abolishing communal family ownership of land known as "Rists," they instituted private ownership. Alienating the balabbats from their rists, the allocated land for administration, the army, an airstrip and port facilities. New residential and commercial zones were demarcated. Bahir Dar was connected by motor-boats with other Lake Tana ports and by motor roads with Gonder, Debre Marqos and Addis Ababa. The physical and social appearance of Bahir Dar was considerably changed. New settlement patterns emerged: and Italian camp, a Muslim community and a Weyto quarter, while the tanners' quarter remained unaffected. Bahir Dar became a melting-pot of different people and cultures. In the commercial zone, different types of shops, tea-rooms, tailor shops, bars and restaurants run by Italians, Arabs, Somalis and Sudanese made their first appearance. Ethiopian participation in this realm was insignificant.

The Italians gave Bahir Dar political importance making it the administrative center of the Lake Tana southern territories. They also showed interest in the possibility of developing the Lake Tana and Blue Nile basic agriculturally and of exploiting their waters for hydroelectric power.
In 1941, the Ethiopian Government was reinstated. It made Bahir Dar a capital, first at a sub-district and then at a district level. Various offices and public services were set up. In 1945 Bahir Dar was raised to the status of a municipality. In the early 1950s, it was considered to be the best site selected for the construction of an alternative capital of Ethiopia.

During the 1960s and 1970s, Bahir Dar grew rapidly, being the capital of the awrajja by the same name in the Gojjam province. The central government developed it as a market and transportation center of the economic growth of Lake Tana and the Blue Nile basin. A comprehensive master plan, with the new zoning, was prepared by German experts. Its implementation changed completely the physical appearance of Bahir Dar, which grew as a center of industrial and economic development. It was provided with a water supply, hydroelectric power, improved lake-port facilities, the Abbay bridge, textile mills, a hospital, and institutions of higher education which now form Bahir Dar University.

During the Ethiopian Civil War, in May 1988 the 603rd corp of the Third Revolutionary Army (TLA) made its headquarters at Bahir Dar. On 3–4 March 1990, the TLA abandoned Bahir Dar in disarray, blowing up the nearby bridge with several hundred soldiers which stopped the TPLF/EPRDF forces from occupying the city. However, the Ethiopian People's Revolutionary Democratic Front (EPRDF) claimed they had too few effectiveness in the area to capture the town at that time, and the Derg army reoccupied Bahir Dar a few days later. The EPRDF gained permanent control of the city around 1810 hours on 23 February 1991, as one of the objectives of Operation Tewodros.
In the 1990s Bahir Dar experienced remarkable growth and expansion. It has become the capital of the Amhara National State. The country's free-market economic policy has encouraged investment and other market potentialities. Today Bahir Dar is not only a center of administration but also a nucleus of commerce, industry, transport, communication, health, education and tourism.

21st century
The city, in honor of the Millennium celebrations, hosted a National Investment Bazaar and Trade Fair on 6–9 January 2007.  Mulat Gezahegn, head of the Trade, Industry and Investment Promotion Coordination Office, told journalists that more than 150 local and foreign companies participated. On 22 June 2019, the Amhara Region coup d'état attempt embroiled with coordinated assassinations of Amhara Region government officials in Bahir Dar and Addis Ababa. General Se'are Mekonnen along with his aide General Gizae Aberra, President of Amhara Region Ambachew Mekonnen along with advisor Ezez Wassie and Amhara Region Attorney General Megbaru Kebede were victims of the assassination. On 24 June, state media announced that General Asaminew Tsige was shot dead in Bahir Dar.

Geography 
The city is located approximately 578 km north-northwest of Addis Ababa. The Lake Tana region is a UNESCO Biosphere Reserve since 2015.

Climate 
Bahir Dar has a borderline tropical savanna climate (Köppen Aw), very close to a subtropical highland climate (Cwb). Afternoon temperatures are very warm to hot year-round, and morning temperatures cool; however, the diurnal range is much larger in the largely cloudless dry season.

Demographics

Based on the 2007 Census conducted by the Central Statistical Agency of Ethiopia (CSA), Bahir Dar Special Zone had a total population of 221,991, of whom 108,456 were male and 113,535 female; 180,174 or 81.16% are urban inhabitants, the rest of population were living in rural kebeles around Bahir Dar. As Philip Briggs notes, Bahir Dar "is not only one of the largest towns in Ethiopia, but also one of the fastest growing – the western outskirts have visibly expanded since the first edition of this guide was published in 1994."

Ethnic and linguistic composition
As of 2007, the three largest ethnic groups reported in Bahir Dar Special Zone were the Amhara (96.23%), the Tigrayan (1.11%), and the Oromo (1.10%); all other ethnic groups made up 1.56% of the population. Amharic was spoken as a first language by 96.77%, 1.03% spoke Oromiffa, and 0.98% spoke Tigrinya; the remaining 1.22% spoke all other primary languages reported. 
The 1994 national census reported a total population for Bahir Dar of 96,140 in 20,857 households, of whom 45,436 were men and 50,704 women. The three largest ethnic groups reported in the city were the Amhara (93.21%), the Tigrayan (3.98%), and the Oromo (0.70%); all other ethnic groups made up 2.11% of the population. Amharic was spoken as a first language by 95.52%, and 2.93% spoke Tigrinya; the remaining 1.55% spoke all other primary languages reported.

The Wayto caste
 
In 1938, an Italian tourist guide noticed well established Wayto villages on Bahir Dar’s lakeshore.

The Wayto nowadays live in three distinct villages within Bahir Dar’s city boundaries; the buildings are made of clay with thatched roofs and have a lifespan of about five years.

In Bahir Dar, the Wayto are outcasted because their traditional lifestyle is considered impure; for the Orthodox Christians the food habits are impure, and the Muslim community does not recognise them as true Muslims because they continue worshipping the Nile. Hence, the majority of the population remains wary of the Wayto.

The health of the Wayto community in Bahir Dar is affected because they continue drinking the lake water, which has become strongly polluted.

The Wayto villages need regularly to change their place by order of the authorities for several reasons: 
ritual places are contested by other population groups;
Amhara have greater financial power to obtain the land;
the Wayto do not hold land titles; and
overall, they have a weak position in negotiation.

Religions

In 2007 census 89.72% of the population said they practiced Ethiopian Orthodox Christianity, 8.47% were Muslim, and 1.62% were Protestants.

The 1994 national census reported 87.53% practiced Ethiopian Orthodox Christianity, and 11.47% of the population said they were Muslim.

The Ethiopian Catholics, who practice the Alexandrian Rite in Geez language, have a cathedral in the city, which is the Episcopal See since 2015 of the Ethiopic Catholic Diocese of Bahir Dar–Dessie, one of the suffragan eparchies (dioceses) of the Ethiopian Catholic Archeparchy of Addis Abeba, a Metropolitanate sui juris.

Culture 

The city offers a small daily market and a very extensive weekly market. There are some music clubs in the city.

The Blue Nile Falls (Tis Issat) are located about 30 km to the south. Nowadays the amount of water running through the falls is being reduced and regulated, since the construction of a hydroelectric power dam. Nevertheless, the Blue Nile Falls are still one of the main tourist attractions of Bahir Dar, especially during the rainy season when the water level rises and the falls become greater.

Education 
Bahir Dar is home to a number of universities and colleges. The most prominent of all is the Bahir Dar University, which projects an enrollment of over 40,000 students in the academic year beginning in October 2012. Bahir Dar University is home to more than 40,000 students. Emperor Haile Sellasie inaugurated the Technical School in Bahir Dar University on 11 June 1963.

As part of political initiatives and development efforts in Africa, renewed interest in the higher education in Ethiopia has been the focus of partnerships between governmental and private funders. The Ethiopian university system has been noted as one of the "fastest growing" systems in the twenty-first century.

Bahir Dar University, one of the largest universities in Ethiopia, has an enrollment of 45,000 students in 65 undergraduate and 67 graduate programs. A Council of Ministers regulation combined the Bahir Dar Polytechnic and Bahir Dar Teachers' College in 2000 to establish the university. Supporting the country's objective to attain a "middle-income status" by 2025, a research priority has produced eleven research centers. within the university.

As part of the US AID objective IR 3.2: Improved workforce skills development, an identified strategy of enhancing "... university partnerships with U.S. Universities to strengthen the capacity of Ethiopian Universities." Primary and secondary education goals are supported by the university through teacher education programs designed to improve literacy rates, supporting employment and higher education opportunities for citizens. Degrees in science and health support the effort to address Ethiopia's inclusion as one of 57 countries on the health workforce crisis list.

Alkan University College is located in Bahir Dar. The Institute of Land Administration was founded and located in Bahir Dar in 2006.

The city has numerous government school including a STEM based High School that is within the University.  There are many private schools too including Bahir Dar Academy, Rispins International School, and an SOS school.

Transportation 

Air transportation in Bahir Dar is served by the Bahir Dar Airport, also known as Airport. there are up to ten flights a day to/from Addis.

The runway was extended to cope with International flights. Horticultural products and other exports can now leave by air.

Additionally, the city is also connected through roads (and buslines) to these cities. The most common and convenient way of traveling in Bahir Dar is cycling. Auto rickshaws and share taxis also provide transportation in the city. Intercity bus service is provided by the Selam Bus Line Share Company, Abay Bus s.c, Ethio Bus s.c and Sky Bus Transport System which operates daily to and from the capital. Tickets offices are mainly in the mall at the south end of the high street, on the left if you have walked up from the lake area/Giorgis.

Now, in 2021, a new road bridge across the Nile, is under construction. It will soon carry the main road to the northern outskirts and on to Gondar

Sports 
Association football is the most popular sport in Bahir Dar. The 60,000-capacity Bahir Dar Stadium and the 15,000-capacity Bahir Dar University Stadium are the main sports venues.

Twin towns – sister cities

Bahir Dar is twinned with:
 Ashdod, Israel (2011)
 Cleveland, United States (2004)
 Madison, United States (2018)
 Oakland, United States (2010)

See also 

 Ethiopian Airlines Flight 604 – an aircraft accident at the airport in 1988

Notes

External links 

 Pictures from Bahir Dar
 Homepage of Lake Tana Biosphere Reserve 
 Lake Tana project webpage of The Nature and Biodiversity Conservation Union (NABU e.V.)

Populated places in the Amhara Region
Populated places on Lake Tana
Zones of Ethiopia
Cities and towns in Ethiopia
Ethiopia